Jerzy "Jurek" Dybał (born 22 June 1977) is a Polish conductor and soloist double-bass. Since 2013, he is the director of the International Krzysztof Penderecki Festival in Zabrze, Poland. Since 2014, he is the director of orchestra at Sinfonietta Cracovia in Kraków.

Career 
Jurek Dybał has been conductor, soloist, recitalist and chamber musician as well as being Associate Principal double-bass in the Vienna Philharmonic Orchestra and the Vienna State Opera Orchestra. Following in the footsteps of such prominent double bassists/conductors as Bottesini, Koussevitzky and Zubin Mehta, Dybał is founder and chief conductor of the "[Paderewski Chamber Orchestra]". He performed with his orchestra on many important European festivals (among others under prestigious patronage of presidents of Germany and Poland), and did World Premiere Recording of newly discovered Ignacy Jan Paderewski's "Suite for Strings". He attended many conductor master classes among others of famous Professor Jorma Panula. Especially close connection conductor holds with the "Bavarian Chamber Philharmonic Orchestra" from Germany, which he led during concert tour celebrating 70th birthday of Dybals’ great compatriot composer Krzysztof Penderecki. Jurek Dybal conducted orchestras in Germany, Finland, Poland, Ukraine and France such as the Sinfonia Varsovia, Bavarian Chamber Philharmonic Orchestra, and Interregionale European Orchestra.

Graduating with distinction from the Chopin Academy of Music in Warsaw, Dybał has been a member of the Mahler Chamber Orchestra, Sinfonia Varsovia Orchestra, and Munich Philharmonic Orchestra. Winner of numerous competitions and the holder of the prestigious grant from "Yamaha Foundation of Europe", has collaborated with such eminent musicians as: Yuri Bashmet, Julian Rachlin, Ernst Kovacic, Reiner Honeck, Itamar Golan, Michael Ursules, Barry Douglas, Chee-Yun, Michel Lethiec, Frans Helmerson, Arto Noras, Konstanty Andrzej Kulka, Piotr Paleczny, Xavier de Maistre and ensembles like "Prima Vista Quartet", "Silesian Quartet", "Klavierquintett Wien", "Wiener Virtuosen", "Münchner Septet". He has recorded for Polish Television, Polish Radio, and Radio France. The artist can be heard on the Polish label DUX, Belgium's RCP and Japanese "Camerata". Two of his "DUX" CDs have garnered a "Fryderyk Award" and one has "Platinum Plate" status from the Polish phonographic industry. Dybał also has a special interest in period performance where he has worked together with ensembles such as La Stagione Frankfurt, Il Tempo Warsaw. He regularly appears at such prominent Festivals as: Festival in Aix-en-Provence, "Toujour Mozart" in Vienna and Salzburg, Łańcut Music Festival, Chopin Festival, Pablo Casals Festival in Prades, Puerto Rico and Paris (Théâtre des Champs-Élysées), "Music Isle Jeju" in Korea, Pacific Music Festival in Sapporo Japan and L.van Beethoven Easter Festival in Warsaw.

Discography 
Uncomplited list of recordings:

 Nowakowski, Stolpe, Noskowski / Vienna Piano Quintet 1 CD/ Camerata Records / 2009-02-01
Content: Józef Nowakowski – Quintet in E-flat major, op. 17, Zygmunt Noskowski – "Polonaise Elegiac" for double-bass solo and piano, Antoni Stolpe – Piano Sextet in E-minor (incomplete), Antoni Stolpe – Polonaise A-flat major for Piano Sextet (Jurek Dybal, Urata Yoko Fog)
Performers: Dybał Jurek; Fog Jorgen; Urata Yoko Fog; Robert Bauerstatter; Holger Groh
Ensemble: Vienna Piano Quintet

Ries: Piano Quartets, Piano Quintets / Vienna Piano Quintet 1 CD/ Camerata Records / 2007-12-01; Ferdinand Ries - Quintet for Piano and Strings, Op. 74
Performers: Dybał Jurek; Fog Jorgen; Urata Yoko Fog; Wachter Peter; Weis Helmut
Ensemble: Vienna Piano Quintet

 ORIENTAL TRUMPET CONCERTOS, Gabor Boldoczki - trumpet, Jurek Dybal - conductor, SInfonietta Cracovia, Sony 2016
 Paderewski Chamber Orchestra, Jurek Dybał – conductor - Jan Ignacy Paderewski - "Suite for strings in G major", DUX Warszawa 2006
 Kwartet Prima Vista, Waldemat Malicki, Jurek Dybał - Jan Sebastian Bach: Koncerty fortepianowe. DUX Warszawa 2000
 Jerzy Dybał, Władysław Kłosiewicz, Konstanty Andrzej Kulka, Kwartet Prima Vista - A. Vivaldi: Cztery pory roku. DUX Warszawa 2000
 Camerata Silesia, Kwartet Prima Vista, Jerzy Dybał - Bóg się rodzi .... DUX Warszawa 1999
 Fryderyk Chopin Piano concerto No 1 E-minor op.11 RCP 011,
Version for piano and string quintet, Kornelia Ogórkówna - piano
Recorded : 25,26, VIII 2000 at Pomeranian Philharmonic Bydgoszcz, RECITAL COMPANY PRODUCTIONS (BELGIUM)

References

External links 
 
 Sinfonietta Cracovia - website
 Director of the International Krzysztof Penderecki Festival in Poland 

1977 births
Living people
21st-century conductors (music)
21st-century double-bassists
21st-century male musicians
Male conductors (music)
Male double-bassists
People from Bytom
Polish conductors (music)
Polish double-bassists